Stephen Pickavance is a British former competitive figure skater. He won the British national title in 1985 and 1986. Pickavance appeared twice at the European Championships, placing 15th in 1985 and 18th in 1986. He also competed at the 1985 World Championships, finishing 21st.

Pickavance is a skating coach, listed as Level 4 by the National Ice Skating Association. He coached Steven Cousins and some of the contestants on Dancing on Ice. He was formerly married to Karen Barber.

Competitive highlights

References 

British male single skaters
Figure skating coaches
Living people
Year of birth missing (living people)